USS Gallatin is a name used more than once by the U.S. Navy:

 , was a cutter used by the Navy during the War of 1812
 , was an attack transport commissioned 15 November 1944

United States Navy ship names